Catoptria orobiella is a species of moth in the family Crambidae. It is found in Italy.

References

Crambini
Endemic fauna of Italy
Moths of Europe
Moths described in 1994